HNLMS Van Ghent (originally named De Ruyter) was an  built for the Royal Netherlands Navy in the 1920s. The destroyer served in the Netherlands East Indies but was wrecked after running aground in 1942.

Design

In the mid-1920s, the Netherlands placed orders for four new destroyers to be deployed to the East Indies. They were built in Dutch shipyards to a design by the British Yarrow Shipbuilders, which was based on the destroyer , which Yarrow had designed and built for the British Royal Navy.

The ship's main gun armament was four  guns built by the Swedish company Bofors, mounted two forward and two aft, with two  anti-aircraft guns mounted amidships. Four 12.7 mm machine guns provided close-in anti-aircraft defence. The ship's torpedo armament comprised six  torpedo tubes in two triple mounts, while 24 mines could also be carried. To aid search operations, the ship carried a Fokker C.VII-W floatplane on a platform over the aft torpedo tubes, which was lowered to the sea by a crane for flight operations.

History
The destroyer De Ruyter was laid down on 28 August 1925, at Koninklijke Maatschappij De Schelde, Vlissingen, was launched on 13 October 1926, and commissioned on 31 May 1928.

She and her sister  left the Netherlands on 27 September 1928, for the Dutch East Indies.

At Tanjung Priok, the ships waited for the royal yacht, Maha Chakri, of the king of Siam, and the destroyer Phra Ruang. After this, the ships, without the submarines, visited Bangka, Belitung, Riau, Lingga Islands, Belawan, and Deli. On 28 August, they returned in Tanjung Priok. On 31 August, she participates in a fleet review at Tanjung Priok, held in honor of the Dutch Queen Wilhelmina of the Netherlands, who was born that day. Other ships that participated in the review where the destroyer Evertsen and the cruiser Java.

While practicing with the cruiser , her sister Evertsen, and five submarines, Sumatra stranded on an uncharted reef near the island Kebatoe, on 14 May 1931.

De Ruyter was renamed Van Ghent on 1 October 1934. She was renamed because of a newly built light cruiser would take that name.

World War II
In 1940, she and her sister , guarded five German cargo ships. The ships were relieved by Java on 26 April 1940.

When war broke out in the Pacific in December 1941, Van Ghent was serving in the Netherlands East Indies as part of Rear Admiral Karel Doorman's command. She was involved in the salvage of the United States cargo ship .

De Ruyter, along with several Dutch and US cruisers and destroyers, took part in an unsuccessful attempt to attack a Japanese invasion convoy reportedly bound for Surabaya (which in actuality was heading to Makassar) on 3–4 February 1942. This battle became known as The Battle of Makassar Strait, with the Allied force being driven off with damage to several ships by Japanese air attacks before ever nearing the convoy. Doorman's forces attempted another sortie against another Japanese invasion convoy on 15 February 1942, and to locate them this time took his ships northwest through the Gaspar Strait, to the east of Bangka Island. While passing through the strait, the Dutch destroyer Van Ghent struck a rock in poor visibility and stuck fast; another Dutch destroyer was then tasked to take off her crew but Van Ghent was considered a wreck and was subsequently scuttled by the destroyer .

References

Bibliography
 Gardiner, Robert and Roger Chesneau. Conway's All The World's Fighting Ships 1922–1946. London: Conway Maritime Press 1980. . 
 Whitley, M.J. Destroyers of World War Two: An International Encyclopedia. London: Cassell & Co, 2000. .
 

Admiralen-class destroyers
Ships built in Vlissingen
1926 ships
World War II destroyers of the Netherlands
World War II shipwrecks in the Pacific Ocean
Maritime incidents in February 1942
Scuttled vessels